The Right-Green People's Party was a right-wing political party in Iceland founded on 17 June 2010.

History
On 27 February 2016, the party was disbanded joined the Icelandic National Front, a right-wing populist party.

On the Issues
The Right-Green party identified with classical liberal and Eurosceptic policy within a right-libertarian context and considered its platform fairly similar to that of former U.S. presidential candidate Ron Paul.

The party wanted to abolish governmental monopolies like Mjólkursamsalan (MS) and ÁTVR, the State Alcohol & Tobacco Company. It also rejected the idea of Iceland joining the European Union, although it wished to put the issue to a referendum. The Right-Green party rolled out plans to replace the Icelandic króna while rejecting the euro, choosing instead to introduce a new currency, the Ríkisdalur (named after Iceland's historical currency, prior to the króna), which would be pegged to the US dollar.

The party advocated the introduction of a 20% flat tax, halt further increases in spending and freeze public hiring for at least four years. It also supported the immediate abolition of customs duties, import tariffs and excise taxes. It also had a nature conservation agenda and called for better protection of Icelandic nature.

Name 
The name Right Greens (Hægri grænir) was a pun on the Left Green Movement, which is known as the Left Greens (Vinstri grænir).

Election results

Parliament

Leaders

References

Defunct political parties in Iceland
Libertarian parties
Political parties established in 2010
Political parties disestablished in 2016
Eurosceptic parties in Iceland
Nationalist parties in Iceland
Green conservative parties